The 1975–76 Utah Utes men's basketball team represented the University of Utah as a member of the Western Athletic Conference during the 1975–76 men's basketball season.

Schedule

References 

Utah
Utah Utes men's basketball seasons
1975 in sports in Utah
1976 in sports in Utah